The governor-general of the West Indies Federation was a post in the government of the West Indies. The federation, also known as the British Caribbean Federation, consisted of Antigua (with Barbuda), Barbados, Cayman Islands, Dominica, Grenada, Jamaica, Montserrat, St. Christopher-Nevis-Anguilla, St. Lucia, St. Vincent, Trinidad and Tobago, and Turks & Caicos Islands. The federation was formed on 3 January 1958, and was formally dissolved on 31 May 1962.

The governor-general was constitutionally required to take advice from the prime minister of the West Indies Federation, but was by far the more powerful and prestigious of the two positions, containing almost all executive authority within the government and containing powers far beyond that of governors-general in the Dominions.

Governor-general of the West Indies Federation (1958–1962)

References

External links
World Statesmen – West Indies Federation

West Indies Federation
West Indies Federation
West Indies Federation, Governor-General
Westminster system
West Indies Federation
Titles held only by one person